Canoeing competitions at the 2019 Pan American Games in Lima, Peru, are scheduled to be held at the Rio Canete located in the city of Lunahuaná (slalom) and Albufera Medio Mundo in the city of Huacho (sprint).

The sprint competitions will start on July 27 and finish on the 30th, while slalom will start on the August 2nd and finish on the 4th.

In 2016, the International Olympic Committee (IOC) made several changes to its sports program, which were subsequently implemented for these games. Included in this was the addition of the women's C2 500 metres event in sprint (the women's C1 200 metres event was also added to the Olympics, but was already contested at the Toronto 2015 Pan American Games). This also meant the removal of two men's events in sprint (C1 200 and K2 200). Also added to just the Pan American Games program was the addition of two extreme (head to head) slalom kayak events.

18 medal events are scheduled to be contested, 12 in sprint (six per gender) and six in slalom (three per gender).

Medal table

Medallists

Slalom

Sprint
Men

Women

Qualification

A total of 169 canoe and kayak athletes will qualify to compete. 125 will qualify in sprint (60 per gender plus five wild cards) and 44 in canoe slalom (22 per gender). The host nation (Peru) is guaranteed two quotas in the slalom events and it must qualify in sprint. A nation may enter a maximum of 6 athletes in slalom (three per gender) and 16 in sprint.

See also
Canoeing at the 2020 Summer Olympics

References

External links
Results book – Canoeing – Slalom
Results book – Canoeing – Sprint

 
Events at the 2019 Pan American Games
Pan American Games
2019